The Durham Regional Police Service (DRPS) is the police service operated by and serving the Regional Municipality of Durham, Ontario, Canada. The DRPS has a strength of over 900 sworn officers and over 300 unsworn members, and serves the following local municipalities, with a combined population of 706,200:

 Pickering
 Oshawa
 Whitby
 Ajax
 Clarington
 Scugog
 Brock
 Uxbridge

The DRPS was formed in 1974 through the amalgamation of a number of local police forces in the area, coinciding with the establishment of the Regional Municipality of Durham.

Organization

The Durham Regional Police Service is led by:

Interim Chief of Police Todd Rollauer
Interim Deputy Chief Joe Mariano (operations)
Deputy Chief Dean Bertrim (operational support)
Chief Administrative Officer Stan MacLellan
Deputy Chief Todd Rollauer was announced as Interim Chief of Police (effective September 12, 2020) following the retirement of Chief of Police Paul Martin. A search for a new Chief of Police is on-going.

Durham Regional Police Headquarters is in Whitby, Ontario at the Regional Municipality of Durham Headquarters building.  Budgeted expenditures for DRPS in Durham Region's 2020 budget were $241.4 million

In October 2008, the Durham Regional Police Service was named one of "Canada's Top 100 Employers" by Mediacorp Canada Inc. and was featured in Maclean's newsmagazine. Later that month, it was also named one of Greater Toronto's Top Employers, which was announced by the Toronto Star newspaper.

Durham Regional Police is a member of OALEP.

In late May 2019, after a request by the Ministry of the Solicitor General (Ontario), the Ontario Civilian Police Commission issued an order that appointed a retired Toronto deputy chief, Mike Federico, as administrator to oversee the force during the OCPC investigation after some of the senior ranks were alleged to have been corrupt and of an abuse of power. As of May 24, 2019, none of the allegations had been proven. Federico’s responsibilities were to include "approving promotions and overseeing all internal discipline". The allegations were first brought to light in an April 19 report in the Toronto Star; at the time, a lawyer representing Chief Paul Martin said the allegations are "false and defamatory". Martin announced on 9 July 2020 that he would be retiring from the Service effective September 2020.

Police senior officers
The day-to-day and regional operations are commanded by senior officers:

Deputy Chief
Superintendent
Inspector
 Civilian directors and managers

Police officers
Detective / Staff Sergeant
Detective / Sergeant
Detective Constable
Senior Constable
Constable - 1st class
Constable - 2nd class
Constable - 3rd class
Constable - 4th class
Special Constables

Operational support units
In 2014, the Durham Regional Police Service had an authorized strength of 871 sworn members and 331 civilians.

Some of the units within the force are:

 Air support unit
 Auxiliary unit (auxiliary constable)
 Canine unit
 Case management unit
 Central cellblock unit
 Communications-911 unit
 Community services unit
 Corporate communications unit
 Courts unit
 Crime analysis unit
 Diversity unit
 Domestic violence investigative unit
 Drug enforcement unit
 E-crimes unit
 Emergency measures/labour liaison unit
 Explosive disposal unit
 Facilities management unit
 Financial services unit
 Firearms unit
 Fleet services unit
 Forensic identification unit
 Fraud unit
 Freedom of information unit
 Gun and gang unit
 General occurrence auditing unit
 Health, wellness and safety unit
 Homicide unit
 Hostage negotiators
 Human resources unit
 Information technology unit
 Legal services unit
 Marine unit
 Major incident command
 Mental health unit
 Offender management unit
 Patrol support unit
 Polygraph unit
 Prisoner transport unit
 Professional standards unit
 Property unit
 Public order unit
 Quality assurance unit
 Regional youth unit
 Robbery unit
 Records unit
 Senior support unit
 Sexual assault and child abuse unit
 Strategic planning unit
 Surveillance unit
 Tactical support unit
 Technical services section
 Threat assessment unit
 Traffic services branch
 Victim services unit
 Volunteer unit
 Warrant liaison unit

Policing divisions 

The force is organized into several divisions:

 West Division - Serving Ajax and Pickering
 Central West Division - Serving Whitby and Western Oshawa
 Central East Division - Serving Oshawa
 East Division - Serving Clarington, Oshawa and Scugog
 North Division - Serving Brock, Scugog and Uxbridge

The Durham Regional Police Service is one of two Greater Toronto Area police forces with police aviation capabilities, the other being the York Regional Police. They operate one Bell 206 helicopter, callsign "AIR1".

Some vehicles bear the motto "Leaders in Community Safety".

Tactical Support Unit

The Tactical Support Unit is responsible for handling dangerous situations not handled by regular uniformed officers. The Durham Regional Police TSU also has a mutual-aid agreement with the York Regional Police Emergency Response Unit. In the event of a large-scale event, or a incident that could take a significant amount of time, both departments provide assistance to one another.

Marine unit

The marine unit is responsible for the enforcement of three bodies of water in the region: Lake Ontario, Lake Scugog, and Lake Simcoe. They also police the area of and around Beaverton, Thorah Island, and parts of the Trent-Severn Waterway. Members of the marine unit are specially trained for marine enforcement and rescue duties, including ice rescue. The unit is attached to the traffic enforcement unit.

The Durham Regional Police Marine Unit also has a mutual aid agreement with the Toronto Police Service for Lake Ontario as well as side-scan sonar and ROV. and with the York Regional Police for Lake Simcoe as well as side-scan sonar and diver services. In the event of a large-scale event, or a call-out that could take a significant amount of manpower, these police services provide mutual assistance to one another.

The Marine Unit consists of one officer, active during the summer months. Durham Police do not patrol the water ways during the off season and winter months.

Additional SAR support provided by PARA-Marine Search and Rescue, Canadian Coast Guard and Canadian Forces 424 Squadron (air support from CFB Trenton).

Equipment

 a 26-foot Zodiac RHIB (2011) with two 200 hp Mercury outboard engines - transported by trailer to Lake Scugog and Lake Simcoe
 a 34-foot Hike Metal Products patrol with two 260 hp supercharged diesel Volvo engines, search and rescue vessel (2004) - named "David Edwards"

Uniform

The DRPS crest is used on vehicles, headgear and uniforms, and consists of St. Edward's Crown over a round blue shield with the legend "Durham Regional Police" in white, encircling a red maple leaf overlaid with gold scales of justice. The crest is based on that of the former City of Oshawa police department, with the maple leaf and scales replacing the city's coat of arms.

Officers are issued Glock .40 caliber pistols.

See also

 Region of Durham Paramedic Services
 Fire Services in Durham Region

References

External links
 Durham Regional Police Service

Law enforcement agencies of Ontario
Regional Municipality of Durham
Whitby, Ontario